Damien Williams (born April 3, 1992) is an American football running back who is a free agent. He played college football at Oklahoma. He was signed by the Miami Dolphins as an undrafted free agent in 2014. He has also played for the Kansas City Chiefs and won Super Bowl LIV with the team. In that Super Bowl, he scored the Chiefs' game-clinching touchdown on a 38-yard run with less than two minutes left in the game.

Early years
Williams attended his freshman year and played varsity at El Cajon Valley High School. Over the next three years, he played high school football at Mira Mesa Senior High School.

College career
Williams was originally expected to play college football at Arizona State but did not meet the ACT test score requirement. So he played at Arizona Western College before transferring to the University of Oklahoma in 2012. In November 2013, he was dismissed from Oklahoma after violating team rules. In two seasons with the Sooners, he rushed for 1,499 yards with 18 touchdowns, including a 95-yard touchdown run against Texas in 2012.

Collegiate statistics

Professional career

Miami Dolphins

2014 season
Williams was signed by the Miami Dolphins after going undrafted in the 2014 NFL Draft.

Williams made his NFL debut in the 2014 season opener against the New England Patriots. He had one kick return for 19 yards in the 33–20 victory. In the next game, a 29–10 loss to the Buffalo Bills, he had five carries for 19 yards. In Week 16, against the Minnesota Vikings, he had six receptions for 50 yards and his first professional touchdown. Overall, he finished the 2014 season with 36 carries for 122 yards and 21 receptions for 187 yards and a touchdown.

2015 season
During Week 2, in a 23–20 loss to the Jacksonville Jaguars, Williams had a receiving touchdown. He finished the 2015 season with 21 receptions for 142 yards and a touchdown.

2016 season
In 2016, Williams played in 15 games, rushing for 115 yards and three touchdowns while recording 23 receptions for 249 yards and three touchdowns. The Dolphins made the playoffs and faced off against the Pittsburgh Steelers in the Wild Card Round. In the 30–12 defeat, he had a four-yard receiving touchdown.

2017 season
Set to be a restricted free agent in 2017, the Dolphins tendered Williams at the lowest level. After reportedly wanting a larger contract than the $1.797 million tender for 2017, he officially signed the tender on May 11, 2017.

Williams entered the 2017 season second on the Dolphins running back depth chart behind Jay Ajayi. After Ajayi was traded to the Philadelphia Eagles, he was named the starting running back ahead of Kenyan Drake. Williams started four games before suffering a shoulder injury in Week 12. He was diagnosed with a dislocated shoulder and was expected to be out for two to three weeks. He ended up missing the remainder of the season.

Williams finished the season with 46 carries for 181 rushing yards along with 20 receptions for 155 yards and a receiving touchdown.

Kansas City Chiefs

2018 season
Williams signed with the Kansas City Chiefs on March 22, 2018.

Williams's role increased after the release of former starter, Kareem Hunt. On December 27, 2018, the Chiefs signed Williams to a two-year, $8.1 million contract extension.

Williams finished the 2018 season with 256 rushing yards, four rushing touchdowns, 23 receptions, 160 receiving yards, and two receiving touchdowns. He was called upon in the playoffs as the Chiefs' feature back. In the Divisional Round victory over the Indianapolis Colts, he had 129 rushing yards and a rushing touchdown to go along with five receptions for 25 receiving yards. In the AFC Championship against the New England Patriots, he had 30 rushing yards, a rushing touchdown, five receptions, 66 receiving yards, and two receiving touchdowns in the 37–31 overtime loss.

2019 season
During Week 9 against the Minnesota Vikings, Williams rushed 12 times for 125 yards and a 91-yard touchdown in the 26–23 win. This was his first game with at least 100 rushing yards of the season. The 91-yard run tied Jamaal Charles for the longest touchdown run in franchise history. In the regular-season finale against the Los Angeles Chargers, Williams rushed 12 times for 124 yards and two touchdowns, including an 84-yard touchdown, and caught four passes for 30 yards during the 31–21 win.

Williams finished the 2019 season with 498 rushing yards and five rushing touchdowns to go along with 30 receptions for 213 receiving yards and two receiving touchdowns. In the Divisional Round of the playoffs against the Houston Texans, he rushed 12 times for 47 yards and two touchdowns and caught two passes for 21 yards and a touchdown during the 51–31 win. In the AFC Championship against the Tennessee Titans, Williams rushed 17 times for 45 yards and a touchdown and caught five passes for 44 yards during the 35–24 win. In Super Bowl LIV against the San Francisco 49ers, Williams rushed 17 times for 104 yards, including a 38-yard touchdown, and caught four passes for 29 yards and a touchdown during the 31–20 win. Williams scored a receiving touchdown with 2:44 left in the game that gave the Chiefs the lead. On the Chiefs next possession, Williams scored the game clinching rushing touchdown that gave the Chiefs a 10 point lead with 1:12 left in the game. He is the first player in Super Bowl history with at least 100 rushing yards while recording a rushing and receiving touchdown.

2020 season
On July 29, 2020, the Chiefs announced that Williams would opt out of the season due to the COVID-19 pandemic. The following day, he announced on Sirius XM NFL radio that the reason he opted out was because his mother had recently been diagnosed with stage IV cancer. Without him, the Chiefs reached Super Bowl LV, but lost 9–31 to the Tampa Bay Buccaneers. He was released after the season on March 16, 2021.

Chicago Bears
On March 26, 2021, Williams signed a one-year contract with the Chicago Bears. In the 2021 season, Williams had 40 carries for 164 rushing yards and four rushing touchdowns to go along with 16 receptions for 103 receiving yards and one receiving touchdown in 12 games.

Atlanta Falcons 
On March 17, 2022, Williams signed a one-year contract with the Atlanta Falcons. He suffered a rib injury in Week 1 and was placed on injured reserve on September 17, 2022. He was released on December 12, 2022.

NFL career statistics

References

External links

Atlanta Falcons bio
Oklahoma Sooners bio

1992 births
Living people
Players of American football from San Diego
African-American players of American football
American football running backs
Arizona Western Matadors football players
Oklahoma Sooners football players
Miami Dolphins players
Kansas City Chiefs players
Chicago Bears players
21st-century African-American sportspeople
Atlanta Falcons players